Jay Leitch-Smith (born 6 March 1990), known as A-Jay Leitch-Smith, is an English professional footballer who plays as a forward for  club Warrington Rylands.

A graduate of the Academy at Crewe Alexandra, he played on loan for Halifax Town, Newcastle Town, ÍBV (Iceland), and Curzon Ashton. He spent six years with Crewe, winning the League Two play-offs in 2012 and the League Trophy in 2013. He signed with Yeovil Town in June 2014, but moved on to Port Vale in July 2015 after a poor season with Yeovil. He finished as Port Vale's top-scorer, before moving on to Shrewsbury Town in June 2016. He joined Scottish Premiership club Dundee on loan for the 2017–18 season. He signed with Morecambe in August 2018 and remained with the club for three seasons. He joined National League side Altrincham in August 2021 and moved on to Warrington Rylands via Nantwich Town in 2022.

Career

Crewe Alexandra
Whilst on the books at Crewe Alexandra as a youth player, Leitch-Smith was loaned out to non-League clubs Halifax Town in November 2008 and Newcastle Town in March 2009. He signed his first professional contract in April 2009, before joining Icelandic club ÍBV on loan. He was recalled from his loan, along with Chris Clements, in early September due to injury problems at Crewe.

He made his League Two debut for Crewe at Gresty Road in a 3–2 defeat to Bury on 29 September 2009, replacing Joel Grant as a substitute in the 80th minute. This was his only appearance of the 2009–10 season. He joined Curzon Ashton on loan in March 2010. He scored seven goals in ten Northern Premier League appearances, which was enough to win him a new contract at Crewe.

He scored his first goal in the English Football League on 21 August 2010, adding the final goal of the "Railwaymen's" 7–0 win over Barnet. However, he was limited to only 18 appearances in the 2010–11 season as he struggled to step up to first team football, and manager Dario Gradi devised a special pre-season fitness programme in the summer to help him to adapt to senior football.

Leitch-Smith scored nine goals in 44 games in the 2011–12 campaign. He signed a new one-year contract in April 2012, and manager Steve Davis stated "I'd like to think that he can become the 15 to 20 goal a season man we need." On 27 May, he played the first 85 minutes of the League Two play-off Final victory over Cheltenham Town at Wembley Stadium, providing the assist for Byron Moore's goal which secured the 2–0 victory and Crewe's promotion into League One.

He scored six goals in 35 matches in the 2012–13 season. On 7 April he made another appearance at Wembley, as the Alex beat Southend United 2–0 in the Football League Trophy Final; he was an 83rd-minute substitute for Max Clayton. The next month he signed a one-year extension to his existing contract. However, he played just 24 games in the 2013–14 season, scoring two goals. He left Crewe after an eleven-year association with his hometown club, saying he felt like a "part of the furniture" of the club.

Yeovil Town
In June 2014, Leitch-Smith signed for Gary Johnson's League One club Yeovil Town on a two-year contract. He struggled in his first season for the "Glovers", as he was played mostly in a wide position. He only scored twice in 38 appearances and was one of four players offered a contract termination by new manager Paul Sturrock following Yeovil's relegation into League Two at the end of the season.

Port Vale
In July 2015, Leitch-Smith signed a 12-month deal with League One side Port Vale after agreeing to leave Yeovil. He earned the contract after impressing manager Rob Page during pre-season training. He scored his first goal for the "Valiants" on 14 November, with a header that opened the scoring in a 2–1 win at Barnsley. This was to start a sequence of five goals in four games, which was the best scoring run of his career to that point. For his performances he was short-listed for the League One player of the month award. After scoring his sixth goal of the season in a 1–1 draw with Scunthorpe United at Vale Park on 12 December he was named in the Football League Paper's team of the day. He scored four goals in four games in January to go into double figures for the season to earn himself a nomination for the PFA fans' player of the month award for League One. Chairman Norman Smurthwaite confirmed that Leitch-Smith had rejected the offer of a new contract from the club in May 2016.

Shrewsbury Town
Leitch-Smith signed with League One side Shrewsbury Town in June 2016, along with former Port Vale teammates Ryan McGivern and Louis Dodds. He scored his first goal for the club in the first minute of a first-round League Cup tie against Championship side Huddersfield Town, with Shrewsbury going on to win 2–1. After an indifferent run of form in Micky Mellon's last weeks as manager, he was recalled to the starting eleven by new manager Paul Hurst for an FA Cup first round tie on 5 November, and scored the second goal in a 3–0 victory over Barnet. He was limited to five goals in 12 starts and nine substitute appearances throughout the 2016–17 campaign, and was not allocated a squad number ahead of the following season as he was not in the club's future plans.

On 31 August 2017, he joined Scottish Premiership club Dundee on a five-month loan deal. He made his debut for the "Dee" on 9 September, coming on as a 38th-minute substitute for Scott Allan in a 4–1 defeat at Rangers. He was given his first start at Dens Park seven days later, scoring twice in a 3–2 win over St Johnstone. In January 2018, the loan agreement was extended to the end of the 2017–18 season after "Dee" manager Neil McCann was impressed by the link-up play he made with striker Sofien Moussa despite him being unable to secure a regular place in the starting eleven. He was released by Shrewsbury at the end of the 2017–18 season.

Morecambe
On 8 August 2018, Leitch-Smith signed a one-year contract with League Two side Morecambe; manager Jim Bentley stated that he had "tried to sign him a couple of years ago." He scored six goals in 29 appearances for the "Shrimps" in the 2018–19 season, having missed the second half of the campaign with a hamstring tear. Despite only scoring six goals and missing half the season he ended the campaign as the club's top-scorer and went on to sign a new two-year contract at the Globe Arena. However he was restricted to just eight league starts in the 2019–20 season before football was suspended in March due to the COVID-19 pandemic in England. He played just seven times in the 2020–21 promotion season, scoring one goal, and was released at the end of his contract.

Non-League
On 7 August 2021, Leitch-Smith joined National League side Altrincham. He said that the attractive football played at Moss Lane reminded him of his time at Crewe. He made just four starts during the 2021–22 season, though made a further 15 substitute appearances and scored four goals, claiming one assist.

In July 2022, Leitch-Smith returned to his native Cheshire to join Northern Premier League Premier Division side Nantwich Town. He scored two goals in sixteen games for the "Dabbers". In November 2022, Leitch-Smith signed for league rivals Warrington Rylands.

Style of play
Though Leitch-Smith lacks natural athleticism and pace, he is an intelligent and creative attacker with good technical skills and a high work rate. Former teammate Tom Pope stated that Leitch-Smith was "one of the most intelligent strikers... in League One".

Career statistics

Honours
Crewe Alexandra
League Two play-offs: 2012
League Trophy: 2013

References

External links

1990 births
Living people
English footballers
Association football forwards
Crewe Alexandra F.C. players
FC Halifax Town players
Newcastle Town F.C. players
Expatriate footballers in Iceland
Íþróttabandalag Vestmannaeyja players
Curzon Ashton F.C. players
Yeovil Town F.C. players
Port Vale F.C. players
Shrewsbury Town F.C. players
Dundee F.C. players
Morecambe F.C. players
Altrincham F.C. players
Nantwich Town F.C. players
Warrington Rylands 1906 F.C. players
English Football League players
Northern Premier League players
Úrvalsdeild karla (football) players
Scottish Professional Football League players
National League (English football) players